Libertini may refer to:

 Richard Libertini (1933-2016), an American stage, film and television actor
 Altri Libertini, first book by the Italian writer Pier Vittorio Tondelli
 Eriogonum libertini, a species of wild buckwheat known by the common name Dubakella Mountain buckwheat